Hemiolia can refer to:

 A type of galley developed in the 4th century BC
 A genus of Euglenida
 An alternative spelling for Hemiola, a musical pattern